The tiexianzai (鐵弦仔), also known as the  guchuixian (鼓吹弦), is a bowed string instrument in the huqin family originating in China. It is a two-stringed fiddle with a characteristic metal amplifying horn at the end of its neck.

According to some sources, it was invented by the Fulao people.

See also 
 Chinese music
 List of Chinese musical instruments
 Huqin

References

Chinese musical instruments
Culture in Hunan
Huqin family instruments